Jasmin St. Claire (born October 23, 1972) is an American former pornographic actress. She is also known for her work as a professional wrestling personality, most notably for ECW. She has made appearances in the world of professional wrestling and such films as Communication Breakdown and National Lampoon's Dorm Daze 2.

Early life
Jasmin St. Claire was born on October 23, 1972 in Saint Croix, U.S. Virgin Islands, U.S. She is an American of Brazilian and Russian descent.

Film career
Among her porn films, St. Claire is known for her appearance in World's Biggest Gang Bang 2, a 1996 sequel to World's Biggest Gang Bang, in which she is advertised as performing a record-breaking 300 sex acts with 300 men in a 24-hour period. St. Claire later described the video as "among the biggest cons ever pulled off in the porn business," with merely about 30 men "strategically placed and filmed," only ten of whom were actually able to perform sexually on camera.

St. Claire was interviewed on The Howard Stern Show for her participation in this film, along with Annabel Chong, the previous record holder, both before and after the event. She subsequently filmed a second gang bang movie, the 1998 film Jasmin's Last Gang Bang. She continued to perform in adult films until 2000, by which time she had appeared in 73 titles. She was inducted into the AVN Hall of Fame in 2011.

St. Claire subsequently briefly acted in non-pornographic independent films. Since 2003 she has appeared in a number of direct-to-DVD films, including Communication Breakdown and National Lampoon's Dorm Daze 2. She subsequently worked for MetalDarkside, a DVDzine. She also hosts the Metal Scene TV show, and is a journalist for Rock Brigade magazine in Brazil.

In 2018 she appeared in the horror film Bad Apples.

Professional wrestling career
St. Claire had a brief stint in ECW, during which she sparred with the "Queen of Extreme" Francine. St. Claire also made appearances for XPW. She made a few appearances for the XWF under the name Jazzy, and managed The Public Enemy.

In July 2002, St. Claire made two appearances for Total Nonstop Action Wrestling. During the first, on July 10, 2002, she performed a strip-tease. A week later, on July 17, Francine attacked St. Claire while she was being interviewed by Goldy Locks. The two had a match later that night which resulted in both women being stripped to their underwear. It ended in a disqualification after interference by The Blue Meanie, and Francine was taken away on a stretcher. This was St. Claire's only wrestling appearance.

St. Claire also bankrolled and helped to run the Pro-Pain Pro Wrestling (3PW) promotion with her then longtime boyfriend Brian Heffron, former ECW star "Blue Meanie". She has said she was trained by Heffron for about a year before stepping into the ring. She acted as manager for both Heffron and The Public Enemy.

Awards
 2011 AVN Hall of Fame inductee

Published works

See also

 Extreme Championship Wrestling
 Xtreme Pro Wrestling
 Pro-Pain Pro Wrestling
 NWA Cyberspace

References

External links

 Online World of Wrestling profile
 
 
 

1972 births
Living people
American female adult models
American pornographic film actresses
American female professional wrestlers
Professional wrestling managers and valets
Professional wrestling promoters
People from Saint Croix, U.S. Virgin Islands
American people of Russian descent
American people of Brazilian descent
21st-century American women